Red Noses is a comedy about the black death by Peter Barnes, first staged at Barbican Theatre in 1985. It depicted a sprightly priest, originally played by Antony Sher, who travelled around the plague-affected villages of 14th century France with a band of fools, known as Floties, offering holy assistance. It was for this play that Barnes won his Olivier award.

Awards and nominations 
Awards
 1985 Laurence Olivier Award for Best New Play

Original cast
Alain Boutros - David Whitaker
Archbishop Monselet - Raymond Bowers
Attendant, Leper - Phillip Dupuy
Bonville, Lefranc - Norman Henry
Brodin - Pete Postlethwaite
Camille - Rowena Roberts
Charles Bembo - Derek Crewe
Dr Antrechau, Patris - Peter Theedom
Druce	- Jimmy Yuill
Evaline, First Leper - Sarah Woodward
First Flagellant - Steve Swinscoe
Frapper - Nicholas Woodeson
Grez - Nicholas Farrell
Jean le Grue - Bernard Horsfall
Marcel Flote - Antony Sher
Marguerite - Polly James
Marie - Katharine Rogers
Mistral, Bigod - Nicholas Bell
Mme de Vonville - Yvonne Coulette
Moncriff, Jacques B - Charles Millham
Mother Metz - Yvonne Coulette
Pellico - Don McKillop
Pope Clement VI - Christopher Benjamin
Rochfort - Richard Easton
Sabine - Cathy Tyson
Scarron - Brian Parr
Second Flagellant - Philip Barnes
Sonnerie - Jim Hooper
Third Flagellant - Tony London
Toulon - Peter Eyre
Viennet, Vosques - James Newall

References

External links

1985 plays
English plays
West End plays
Laurence Olivier Award-winning plays
Black comedy plays